The Rivière de Puvirnituq (English: Puvirnituq River; formerly the Rivière de Povungnituk) is a river in Kativik, Nord-du-Québec, Quebec, Canada. The river flows  from its source at an unnamed lake to Hudson Bay at the village of Puvirnituq. Its watershed encompasses . The name of the river comes from the Inuktitut "smells like rotten meat."

The "Povungnituk River" crosses for 40.9 km from east to west the northern limit of the Pingualuit National Park which is characterized by the Pingualuit crater. This crater is located 16.7 km south of the "Puvirnituq River".

The surface of the Puvirnituq River is generally frozen annually from October to June (sometimes until July). Sometimes during the spring flood, ice jams form on the river.

Sport fishing is popular at the foot of the first (about ), second (about ) and third (about ) falls from the confluence of this river and Hudson Bay.

Geography 
The surrounding hydrographic slopes of the Puvirnituq River are:
 north side: Qikirtaluup Kuunga River, Little Puvirnituq River;
 east side: Ungava Bay;
 south side: North River (Hudson Bay), Lac Guillaume-Delisle, Péloquin Lake, Vachon River, Nantais Lake, Manarsulik Lake (formerly named "Lake Laflamme"), Pingualuit crater;
 west side: Hudson Bay.

 'Course of the river from the head'  (segment of )

The "Puvirnituq River" originates from a small unnamed lake of mountain located west of the watershed between the Ungava Bay watershed, Hudson Bay and Hudson Strait.

From the mouth (located to the south) of the lake, the water flows into the "Puvirnituq River" which flows south  through some lakes formed by the lake. flare of the river.

The latter lake is located northeast of Manarsulik Lake (formerly Lacflamme Lake), which is the head lake of the Vachon River, a tributary of the Arnaud River. The latter flows north-east to spill over the western coast of Ungava Bay.

From the outlet of Lake Saint-Germain, the "Puvirnituq River" flows westward ( to the outlet of lake Nantais.

 'Course downstream of Lake Lallemand'  (segment of )

The Puvirnituq River takes its headwaters from Lallemand Lake (length:  in the north–south direction,). This complex form of water has some dozens of islands, many peninsulas and bays. This lake receives on the northeastern side the waters of the Little Puvirnituq River. The river flows south on  crossing a body of water formed by the widening of the river.

which is formed by the Avarqutaak Islands. Going up these falls and the Kuukallak pass, one reaches the Puvirnituq lake which is crossed by the Puvirnituq river.

The village of Puvirnituq is located on the north shore of the latter bay, facing Fat Island and Qikirtaaluk Island. The Formal River (coming from the South-East) flows to the south shore of this bay, ie  from the entrance to the bay.

The main tributaries of the Puvirnituq River are:
 Little Puvirnituq River which flows almost straight to the southwest parallel to the upper part of the Puvirnituq River, to discharge on the north shore of the German Lake. The latter lake is the main body of water in the Puvirnituq River;
 Decoumte River, coming from the southeast.

While flowing to the southwest, the river flows through Papittukaaq Lake and Puvirnituq Lake before spilling over the eastern shore of Hudson Bay at the height of the village of Puvirnituq .

Toponymy 

The term "Puvirnituq" is used to refer to the northern village, lake, river, small river, mountains and national park reserve. This term comes from the word "puvirniq" meaning "rotten meat" because the animal swelled and rotted before being opened.

The toponym "rivière de Puvirnituq" was formalized on February 23, 1995 at the Commission de toponymie du Québec.

References

External links 
 Commission de toponymie - Québec

See also
Pingualuit crater
Nunavik
Hudson Bay
List of rivers of Quebec

Rivers of Nord-du-Québec
Tributaries of Hudson Bay
Nunavik